Jhamat Noabad is a village situated near Kotli Kohala in the district of Gujrat, Pakistan.

References

Villages in Gujrat District